Tiia Erika Hautala (born 3 April 1972 in Pori) is a Finnish former heptathlete.

Achievements

External links

1972 births
Living people
Sportspeople from Pori
Finnish heptathletes
Athletes (track and field) at the 1996 Summer Olympics
Athletes (track and field) at the 2000 Summer Olympics
Athletes (track and field) at the 2004 Summer Olympics
Olympic athletes of Finland
LGBT track and field athletes
Finnish LGBT sportspeople